This article lists the main target shooting events and their results for 2015.

World Events

International Shooting Sport Federation
 June 20 - July 11 2015 World Shotgun Championships, held in Lonato del Garda, Italy

ISSF World Cup
 2015 ISSF World Cup
 2015 ISSF Junior World Cup

International Confederation of Fullbore Rifle Associations

International Practical Shooting Confederation
 September 13-19: 2015 IPSC Shotgun World Shoot in Agna, Italy

FITASC
2015 Results

Island Games
 June 27 - July 3: Shooting at the 2015 Island Games in Jersey

Military World Games
 October 2-11: Shooting at the 2015 Military World Games in Mungyeong, South Korea

Summer Universiade
 July 5-10: Shooting at the 2015 Summer Universiade in Naju, South Korea

Regional Events

Africa

African Shooting Championships
 November 29 - December 6: 2015 African Shooting Championships in Cairo, Egypt

Americas

Pan American Games
 July 12-19: Shooting at the 2015 Pan American Games held at the Pan Am Shooting Centre in Toronto, Canada

Asia

Asian Shooting Championships
 September 25 - October 1: 2015 Asian Airgun Championships held on the Dr. Karni Singh Shooting Range in Delhi, India.
 November 1-12: 2015 Asian Shooting Championships in Kuwait City.

Pacific Games
 July 6-11: Shooting at the 2015 Pacific Games in Port Moresby, Papua New Guinea

Southeast Asian Games
 June 6-12: Shooting at the 2015 Southeast Asian Games in Singapore

Europe

European Games
 June 13-19: Shooting at the 2015 European Games in Baku, Azerbaijan

European Shooting Confederation
 March 3-7: 2015 European 10 m Events Championships in Arnhem, Netherlands
 July 19-31: 2015 European Shooting Championships in Maribor, Slovenia

Games of the Small States of Europe
 June 2-4: Shooting at the 2015 Games of the Small States of Europe

National Events

United Kingdom

NRA Imperial Meeting
 July, held at the National Shooting Centre, Bisley
 Queen's Prize winner: 
 Grand Aggregate winner: Dr GCD Barnett
 Ashburton Shield winners: Ellesmere College
 Kolapore Winners: 
 National Trophy Winners: 
 Elcho Shield winners: 
 Vizianagram winners: House of Commons

NSRA National Meeting
 August, held at the National Shooting Centre, Bisley
 Earl Roberts British Prone Champion:

USA
 2015 NCAA Rifle Championships, won by West Virginia Mountaineers

References

 
2015 in sports